Darwin Harrikson Cubillán Salom  (born November 15, 1972) is a Venezuelan former Major League Baseball right-handed relief pitcher.

Career
Originally signed as a free agent by the Yankees in 1993, Cubillán has played in the MLB for the Toronto Blue Jays (2000), Texas Rangers (2000), Montreal Expos (2001) and Baltimore Orioles (2004). In three-season career, Cubillán compiled a 1–0 record with 54 strikeouts and a 6.85 ERA.

Cubillán played in Japan for the Hanshin Tigers of the Central League, Nippon Professional Baseball (NPB) from 2005 until 2007. He played using his first name "Darwin", because his last name Cubillán sounds like "Kubi yan" (クビやん) meaning "He is fired, isn't he?" in Japanese Kansai dialect, and "Darwin" has the same spelling as the last name of an English naturalist, Charles Darwin. In 2008, he signed with the SK Wyverns in South Korea, but was released during the season.

Cubillán also pitched winter ball for the Tigres de Aragua and Leones del Caracas clubs of the Venezuelan Professional Baseball League.

See also
 List of Major League Baseball players from Venezuela

External links
, or Retrosheet, or The Baseball Gauge, or Pura Pelota (VPBL)

1972 births
Living people
Baltimore Orioles players
Diablos Rojos del México players
Dorados de Chihuahua players
Greensboro Bats players
Guerreros de Oaxaca players
Gulf Coast Yankees players
Hanshin Tigers players
KBO League pitchers
Leones del Caracas players
Major League Baseball pitchers
Major League Baseball players from Venezuela
Mexican League baseball pitchers
Montreal Expos players
Nippon Professional Baseball pitchers
Oklahoma RedHawks players
Ottawa Lynx players
People from Zulia
Rimini Baseball Club players
SSG Landers players
Syracuse SkyChiefs players
T & A San Marino players
Tampa Yankees players
Texas Rangers players
Tigres de Aragua players
Toronto Blue Jays players
Venezuelan expatriate baseball players in Canada
Venezuelan expatriate baseball players in Italy
Venezuelan expatriate baseball players in Japan
Venezuelan expatriate baseball players in Mexico
Venezuelan expatriate baseball players in South Korea
Venezuelan expatriate baseball players in the United States
Venezuelan expatriate baseball players in San Marino